A Libris Award is a prize for Canadian literature. It is awarded by the Canadian Booksellers Association (CBA) on an annual basis. Nominations are solicited from CBA members, and the three candidates with the most nominations are put to a vote.

There are 13 categories of awards available:
 Author
 Fiction Book
 Non-Fiction Book
 Specialty Bookseller
 Campus Bookseller
 Bookseller
 Editor
 Salesperson
 Distributor
 Small Press Publisher
 Publisher
 Children's Book
 Young Readers' Book

The CBA Lifetime Achievement Award is also associated with the Libris Awards, although not officially a category.

The awards are presented at the national CBA conference gala. Notable previous winners include Alice Munro, Mordecai Richler, senator and former United Nations peacekeeping commander Roméo Dallaire, politician and diplomat Stephen Lewis, and environmentalist David Suzuki.

The bookseller awards, meant to recognize "excellence in book retailing", are not necessarily indicative of profit: as a National Post article noted, one Toronto-based bookstore announced that it was closing only a few days after receiving the Specialty Bookseller award.

References

Publisher awards
Canadian fiction awards
Canadian non-fiction literary awards
Editor awards (print)
Canadian children's literary awards